Qorqi or Qarqi may refer to:
 Qarqi, Razavi Khorasan
 Qorqi-ye Olya
 Qorqi-ye Sofla